The Parallel Lines 30th Anniversary Tour was a 2008 worldwide concert tour by Blondie both to promote the 30th anniversary re-release of their ground-breaking 1978 album Parallel Lines, and to celebrate the longevity and success of the album. Concerts were held in North America and Europe with a single stop in Israel.

Background
The tour was announced in April 2008 with the band also releasing a tour promo video.

The entirety of the Parallel Lines album was performed during the tour which opened each concert with other Blondie's songs following, however songs "Just Go Away", "11:59", "Will Anything Happen?" and "Pretty Baby" from Parallel Lines were removed from certain concerts. It was actually rare to find a concert of the tour featuring all twelve songs from the original album. The band also performed songs from Debbie Harry's solo album Necessary Evil, which was released the previous year, along with non-album single "Fit Right In".

The tour marked Blondie's first performances in Israel and Russia.

Opening acts
The Stranglers

Set list
This set list is representative of the performance on July 22, 2008, in New York City. It does not represent the set list at all concerts for the duration of the tour.

"Hanging on the Telephone"
"One Way or Another"
"Picture This"
"Fade Away and Radiate"
"Pretty Baby"
"I Know but I Don't Know"
"11:59"
"Will Anything Happen"
"Sunday Girl"
"Heart of Glass"
"I'm Gonna Love You Too"
"Just Go Away"
"Whiteout"
"Screaming Skin"
"Necessary Evil"
"(I'm Always Touched by Your) Presence, Dear"
"Rapture"/"Hey! Bo Diddley"/"No Exit"
"Call Me"
Encore
"The Tide Is High"/"I'll Take You There"
"My Heart Will Go On"
"Get Off of My Cloud"

Tour dates

Personnel
Band
Debbie Harry – vocals
Chris Stein – guitars
Clem Burke – drums
Matt Katz-Bohen – keyboards, piano, organ
Leigh Foxx – bass
Paul Carbonara – guitars
Crew
Jim Roese – stage manager

Notes

References

Blondie (band) concert tours
2008 concert tours